Mashitah binti Ibrahim (Jawi: ماشطة ابراهيم) (born 9 October 1964) is a Malaysian politician. She is a member of the United Malays National Organisation (UMNO), a component party in Barisan Nasional (BN) coalition. She served as the Senator as well as the Deputy Minister in the Prime Minister's Department in charge of Islamic affairs from 2008 to 2013 and Member of Parliament for Baling from 2004 to 2008.

Election results

Honours
  :
  Knight Companion of the Order of the Crown of Pahang (DIMP) – Dato' (2000)
  :
  Knight Companion of the Order of Loyalty to the Royal House of Kedah (DSDK) - Dato' (2006)

References

1964 births
Living people
People from Kedah
Malaysian people of Malay descent
Malaysian Muslims
United Malays National Organisation politicians
Members of the Dewan Rakyat
Members of the Dewan Negara
Women members of the Dewan Rakyat
Women members of the Dewan Negara
Women in Kedah politics